Louise Ayling (born 23 October 1987 in Invercargill) is a New Zealand rower.  At the 2012 Summer Olympics, she competed in the women's lightweight double sculls with Julia Edward.  She won the silver medal in the lightweight single sculls on home water at Karapiro at the 2010 World Championships and now teaches at Meadowbank School in Auckland Remuera.

References

External links 
 
 
 
 

1987 births
Living people
New Zealand female rowers
Sportspeople from Invercargill
Rowers at the 2012 Summer Olympics
Olympic rowers of New Zealand
World Rowing Championships medalists for New Zealand
21st-century New Zealand women